Inflation most commonly refers to a rise in the general price level over a period of time (also known as price inflation).

Inflation may also refer to:

Business and economics
 Job title inflation
 Monetary inflation, an expansion in the quantity of money in an economy

Education
 Credential inflation, the devaluing of academic credentials and increase in academic requirements, due to the increase over time of the average level of education
 Grade inflation, the increase over time of academic grades, faster than any real increase in standards

Natural sciences
 Inflation (cosmology), the expansion of space in the early universe at a very high rate; the inflationary epoch lasted from 10−36 seconds after the Big Bang to sometime between 10−33 and 10−32 seconds
 Warm inflation, a particular description of cosmological inflation
 The act of inflating an inflatable, anything designed to be expanded with air or gas (such as a balloon)
 The pufferfish's ability to inflate its body when under duress.

Mathematics and computation
 The action of INFLATE, the algorithm that reverses DEFLATE compression
 The inflation map in group cohomology (mathematics)

Other
Body inflation, a type of paraphilia.

See also
 
 Expansion (disambiguation)
 Deflation (disambiguation), the antonym of inflation